Shake, Rattle and Roll Fourteen: The Invasion (simply known as Shake, Rattle and Roll XIV or Shake, Rattle and Roll 14) is a 2012 Filipino science fiction horror anthology film directed by Chito S. Roño, and the fourteenth installment of the Shake, Rattle & Roll film series. The film stars an ensemble cast including Dennis Trillo, Lovi Poe, Janice de Belen, Herbert Bautista, Paulo Avelino, Martin Escudero and Vhong Navarro.

The film was produced by Regal Entertainment and Regal Multimedia, Inc. The film is an official entry to the 38th Metro Manila Film Festival. The film also serves as the Most Independent throughout the entire series for its sole director, Chito S. Roño.

The film features the return of Janice de Belen and Herbert Bautista, both of which starred in past Shake, Rattle and Roll installments.

The fifteenth and final installment, Shake, Rattle & Roll XV, was released in 2014.

Plot

"Pamana"
In 1983, four cousins: an emigrant Benedict (Eri Neeman), narcissistic Myra (Janice de Belen), eloquent Faye (Arlene Muhlach) and former clergyman Donald (Herbert Bautista) gather in their late uncle's house to get their inheritance of 5 million pesos each. Their uncle's butler told them if one of them dies within a month, his/her inheritance goes to the others. Each of them were given the responsibility of taking care of a comic book written by their uncle (Johnny Barnes). The cousins show no interest to their comic books, except Donald, and throw it away. Meanwhile, their emigrant cousin was killed by Filomena (Dimples Romana), a malakat from one of his uncle's comics.

They return to their uncle's house only to find out the butler had died. At the strike of midnight, the characters in the comics came to life. Donald, with the help from Rosalda (Snooky Serna), a ghostly pianist, had discovered there was an even stronger character, Buboy ang Munting Diablo. Buboy (Rain Pogi Quite) kills them one by one.

By morning, it was only Myra and her daughter, Gladys (Anna Vicente), who survived the night. They rushed out of the house and went inside a taxi. Myra's stepson, Filemon (Gerald Pesigan), follows and gives Myra four cheques worth 5 million pesos each. It was actually Buboy who had impersonated Filemon who gave her the cheques. As they leave, the taxi driver activates his cab's sound system to news broadcasts as nearby residents also do the same on their own radios wherein a reporter announces the imminent arrival of the plane carrying Benigno Aquino, Jr.

"Lost Command"
Members of the Philippine Army's Special Unit 21 led by 1Lt. Bert Garces (Rommel Padilla) and MSgt. Martin Barrientos (Dennis Trillo) are sent on a mission to counter insurgencies in the remote jungles of Mindanao perpetrated by a certain Kapitan Baltog, leader of a lost command squad now known as Alsa Puersa.

Following the insurgents' trail, the group goes to Barangay Pototan where Barrientos meets Bunag (Makisig Morales), a local who claims "undead soldiers" were "recruiting" his father. An unexpected encounter leaves a third of the platoon missing including Garces as the insurgents abducted them. Barrientos decides to rescue Garces and the others, despite Corp. Upaon's (Paulo Avelino) suggestion to notify base and get back-up. Bunag volunteers to become the group's guide.

The group later encounters the blind Linda (Ella Cruz) in the forest and offers to lead them to her father, leader of a group fighting what she confirms to be zombies. Upaon voices his doubts, and could neither radio base nor convince Barrientos to go back. 1Pvt. Conde (Martin Escudero), meanwhile, voices his support of Barrientos' decision not to abandon their teammates so they push on ahead to a part of the forest that not even Bunag was familiar with.

Linda's father (Ronnie Lazaro) turns out to be a zombie, and has been using his daughter to bring in the unsuspecting new "recruits". An undead Garces shows up, revealing he has retained his intellect and urges the remaining soldiers to join the "new army". Barrientos and his men put up a gallant but short-lived stand causing them to become captives.

Upaon finally manages to radio for back-up before being dragged away by a zombie as Barrientos regains consciousness and meets a zombified vigilante named Col. Rolando Palma (Roi Vinzon), revealing himself to be Kapitan Baltog. He formed the Alsa Puersa, aiming to replace the current army starting with the zombified Special Unit 21. Palma also explains he was zombified somehow due to tainted food provisions. Refusing to accept defeat after being surrounded by the undead, Barrientos manages to rescue Upaon after detonating a nearby cache. However, he is forced to euthanize Upaon who has begun to change after being forced to consume tainted meat.

Meanwhile, Conde narrowly escapes his zombified platoon and finds Barrientos. The two try to escape but get separated along the way. Conde ends up encountering a soldier who can seemingly change into a normal human, and the outcome is left unknown. Barrientos, on the other hand, encounters Linda's father who offers to help him escape in exchange for getting Linda out of the forest. He explains the zombies are somehow unable to cross bodies of water, so he pushes Barrientos into a nearby river before being mauled by the zombified soldiers. Barrientos is found and rescued by an Army helicopter due to Upaon's earlier distress call.

As Barrientos recuperates in a military hospital ward, the nurse informs him that he is not the only survivor of his unit. Garces and Upaon are seen in the beds next to his, revealing that they too can morph. The ending scene shows a zombified soldier attacking a nurse.

"Unwanted"
On December 21, 2012, Hank (Vhong Navarro) and his pregnant girlfriend Kate (Lovi Poe) goes to the mall to retrieve their gift for their parents to announce their engagement. Hank leaves Kate outside the gift shop to get their gift. As Hank began to retrieve his gift, a sudden explosion shakes and destroys the mall.

Hank soon finds himself trapped in the mall's wreckage along with other survivors: Neil, Tom, and his niece Ming. Hank is worried about Kate being separated and due to the fact that she's pregnant. The four survivors begin to search for other survivors but they encounter something strange.

After encountering an electric eel-like alien electrocuting anything on its path, they begin to speculate that a group of sea creature-like aliens caused the explosion. Soon after, they encounter a lobster-like alien, which kills Neil.

The trio begin to make their way through the wreckage, and after some time, finds Kate, injured and traumatized by what she saw earlier. Ming then hears many survivors in the corner. When a survivor runs towards them, he tells them an unknown alien is chasing him. The survivor then flees. Then the alien appears. Tom tries to fight it off, but is killed when the head of the alien jumps on top of him. The alien's body, headless, begins chasing Hank, Kate, and Ming. They outrun it. Soon, they see a teenager (Jairus Aquino) crying. When they approach it, they realize it's a trap. A lobster alien appears using the teenager as bait for luring survivors. The alien kills Ming and the teenager. Hank and Kate flee.

They encounter a fat man/barber (Chokoleit). As he is the only one who knows the emergency exits, they take him with them. A small lobster alien chases them, but is killed when Rex (Carlo Aquino) shoots the alien with a shotgun. Rex was a robber who was arrested earlier by security guards but when the mall was hit by the explosion, took the opportunity to take the guards' shotgun. The four of them saw a hooded figure in the dark. They follow it. Then they eventually see that the hooded figure is the leader of the aliens. The aliens' mothership tries to suck everyone in it. The fat man/barber is sucked and is killed inside the ship. Rex tries to shoot the leader but clones into many whenever he shoots it. The trio flee.

Inside an arcade, they encounter the lobster aliens and the Alpha Lobster alien who is bigger and covered in spikes. Rex stays behind buying Hank and Kate some time. Rex kills as many as he can but is eventually killed by the Alpha. Hank and Kate make their way outside the mall, overlooking the chaos and destruction the aliens brought upon the city of Manila, including SM Mall of Asia, the whole mall complex and the Mall of Asia Arena which has become infested with aliens. The deceased survivors: Neil, Tom, Ming, the fat man/barber, and Rex, all turned aliens, appear behind the couple. The transformed aliens tells them that Hank and Kate are the only ones left of their kind, and that they will start a new world, a new generation, infested with aliens.

Cast

Pamana 

Herbert Bautista as Donald
 Janice de Belen as Myra 	
 Arlene Muhlach as Faye	
 Dennis Padilla as Benjie	
 Snooky Serna as Rosalda
 Dimples Romana as Filomena
 Lou Veloso as Katiwala
 Empress Schuck as Cynthia
 Ivan Dorschner as Emerson
 Gerald Pesigan as Filemon
 Eri Neeman as Benedict 
 Anna Vicente as Gladys
 Fabio Ide as Konde Nado
 Rain Pogi Quite as Buboy
 Alex Bolado as Tiyanak
 Johnny Barnes as Uncle Lando

Lost Command 

 Dennis Trillo as Master Sgt. Martin Barrientos
 Rommel Padilla as 1st Lt. Bert Garces
 Paulo Avelino as Corp. Lamberto Upaon
 Martin Escudero as Private Solomon Conde
 Alex Castro as Pvt. Hilario Tabios
 JC Tiuseco as Pvt. 1st Class Maximo Ornedo
 AJ Dee as Pvt. 1st Class Blas Rogado
 Ronnie Lazaro as Linda's Father	
 Roi Vinzon as Kapitan Baltog/Col. Rolando Palma
 Makisig Morales as Bunag
 Ella Cruz as Linda	
 Benz Sangalang as Pvt. Joaquin Gallego	
 Chris Pasturan as Zombie 1
 Lester Llansang as Zombie 2
 Kenneth Salva as Pvt. 1st Class Tomas Pugeda
 Mon Confiado as Lawan

Unwanted 

 Vhong Navarro as Hank
 Lovi Poe as Kate
 Carlo Aquino as Rex
 Eula Caballero as Ming
 Chokoleit† as Fat Man/Barber 
 Eric Tai as Tom
 Albie Casiño as Neil
 Jairus Aquino as Teenager
 Lollie Mara as Hank's Mother
 Ariel Ureta as Hank's Father
 Mailes Kanapi as Nurse
 Liesl Batucan as Saleslady
 Veronica Columna as Woman

Reception 
The film is rated PG for all ages. The film is Graded A by The Cinema Evaluation Board, but was rated SPG by MTRCB for the 'Horror' theme.

Accolades

See also
Shake, Rattle & Roll (film series)
List of ghost films

References

External links 

Official Website

2012 horror films
2012 films
Philippine action horror films
Philippine science fiction action films
Philippine science fiction horror films
2010s science fiction horror films
Regal Entertainment films
Films directed by Chito S. Roño